Samuel Benjamin Harris (born April 9, 1967) is an American philosopher, neuroscientist,  author, and podcast host. His work touches on a range of topics, including rationality, religion, ethics, free will, neuroscience, meditation, psychedelics, philosophy of mind, politics, terrorism, and artificial intelligence. Harris came to prominence for his criticism of religion, and Islam in particular, and is known as one of the "Four Horsemen" of New Atheism, along with Richard Dawkins, Christopher Hitchens, and Daniel Dennett.

Harris's first book, The End of Faith (2004), won the PEN/Martha Albrand Award for First Nonfiction and remained on The New York Times Best Seller list for 33 weeks. Harris has since written six additional books: Letter to a Christian Nation in 2006, The Moral Landscape: How Science Can Determine Human Values in 2010, the long-form essay Lying in 2011, the short book Free Will in 2012, Waking Up: A Guide to Spirituality Without Religion in 2014, and (with British writer Maajid Nawaz) Islam and the Future of Tolerance: A Dialogue in 2015. Harris's work has been translated into over 20 languages.

Harris has debated with many prominent figures on the topics of God or religion, including William Lane Craig, Jordan Peterson, Rick Warren, Andrew Sullivan, Reza Aslan, David Wolpe, Deepak Chopra, Ben Shapiro, and Jean Houston. Since September 2013, Harris has hosted the Making Sense podcast (originally titled Waking Up), which has a large listenership. In September 2018, Harris released a meditation app, Waking Up with Sam Harris. He was one of the original core members of the so-called "intellectual dark web", although Harris has stated that he does not identify as a part of that group.

Critics have argued that Harris's writings are Islamophobic. Harris and his supporters, however, reject this characterization, adding that such a labeling is an attempt to silence criticism.

Early life and education 
Samuel Benjamin Harris was born in Los Angeles, California, on April 9, 1967. He is the son of actor Berkeley Harris, who appeared mainly in Western films, and TV writer and producer Susan Harris (née Spivak), who created Soap and The Golden Girls, among other series. His father, born in North Carolina, came from a Quaker background, and his mother is Jewish but not religious. He was raised by his mother following his parents' divorce when he was aged two. Harris has stated that his upbringing was entirely secular and that his parents rarely discussed religion, though he also stated that he was not raised as an atheist.

While his original major was in English, Harris became interested in philosophical questions while at Stanford University after an experience with MDMA. The experience interested him in the idea he might be able to achieve spiritual insights without the use of drugs. Leaving Stanford in his second year, a quarter after his psychoactive experience, he visited India and Nepal, where he studied meditation with teachers of Buddhist and Hindu religions, including Dilgo Khyentse. Eleven years later, in 1997, he returned to Stanford, completing a B.A. degree in philosophy in 2000. Harris began writing his first book, The End of Faith, immediately after the September 11 attacks.

He received a Ph.D. in cognitive neuroscience in 2009 from the University of California, Los Angeles, using functional magnetic resonance imaging to conduct research into the neural basis of belief, disbelief, and uncertainty. His thesis was titled The Moral Landscape: How Science Could Determine Human Values. His advisor was Mark S. Cohen.

Career

Writing
Harris's writing focuses on philosophy, neuroscience, and criticism of religion. He came to prominence for his criticism of religion (Islam in particular) and he is described as one of the Four Horsemen of Atheism, along with Richard Dawkins, Christopher Hitchens, and Daniel Dennett. He has written for publications such as The New York Times, the Los Angeles Times, Economist, London Times, The Boston Globe, and The Atlantic. Five of Harris's books have been New York Times bestsellers, and his writing has been translated into over 20 languages. The End of Faith (2004) remained on The New York Times Best Seller list for 33 weeks.

Harris has a chapter giving advice in Tim Ferriss's 2016 self-help book Tools of Titans.

Debates on religion
In 2007, Harris engaged in a lengthy debate with conservative commentator Andrew Sullivan on the Internet forum Beliefnet. In April 2007, Harris debated with evangelical pastor Rick Warren for Newsweek magazine. Harris debated with Rabbi David Wolpe in 2007. In 2010, Harris joined Michael Shermer to debate with Deepak Chopra and Jean Houston on the future of God in a debate hosted by ABC News Nightline. Harris debated with Christian philosopher William Lane Craig in April 2011 on whether there can be an objective morality without God. In June and July 2018, he met with Canadian psychologist Jordan Peterson for a series of debates on religion, particularly the relationship between religious values and scientific fact in defining truth. Harris has debated with the scholar Reza Aslan.

Podcast
In September 2013, Harris began releasing the Waking Up podcast (since re-titled Making Sense). Episodes vary in length but often last over two hours. Releases do not follow a regular schedule.

The podcast focuses on a wide array of topics related to science and spirituality, including philosophy, religion, morality, free will, neuroscience, meditation, psychedelics and artificial intelligence. Harris has interviewed a wide range of guests, including scientists, philosophers, spiritual teachers, and authors. Guests have included Jordan Peterson, Dan Dennett, Janna Levin, Sharon Salzberg, and David Chalmers.

Meditation app
In September 2018, Harris released a meditation course app, Waking Up with Sam Harris. The app provides daily meditations; long guided meditations; daily "Moments" (brief meditations and reminders); conversations with thought leaders in psychology, meditation, philosophy, psychedelics, and other disciplines; a selection of lessons on various topics, such as Mind & Emotion, Free Will, and Doing Good; and more. Users of the app are introduced to several types of meditation, such as mindfulness meditation, vipassanā-style meditation, loving-kindness meditation, and Dzogchen.

In September 2020, Harris announced his commitment to donate at least 10% of Waking Up's profits to highly effective charities, thus becoming the first company to sign the Giving What We Can pledge for companies. The pledge was retroactive, taking into account the profits since the day the app launched 2 years previously.

Views

Religion 

Harris is a critic of religion, and is a leading figure in the New Atheist movement. Harris is particularly opposed to what he refers to as dogmatic belief, and says that "Pretending to know things one doesn't know is a betrayal of science – and yet it is the lifeblood of religion." While purportedly opposed to religion in general and the belief systems of them, Harris believes that all religions are not created equal. Often invoking Jainism to contrast Islam as a whole, Harris highlights the difference in the specific doctrine and scripture as the main indicator of a religion's value, or lack thereof.

In 2006, Harris described Islam as "all fringe and no center," and wrote in The End of Faith that "the doctrine of Islam [...] represents a unique danger to all of us", arguing that the war on terror is really a war against Islam. In 2014, Harris said he considers Islam to be "especially belligerent and inimical to the norms of civil discourse", as it involves what Harris considers to be "bad ideas, held for bad reasons, leading to bad behavior." In 2015 Harris and secular Islamic activist Maajid Nawaz cowrote  Islam and the Future of Tolerance. In this book, Harris argues that the word Islamophobia is a "pernicious meme", a label which prevents discussion about the threat of Islam. Harris has been described in 2020 by Jonathan Matusitz, Associate Professor at the University of Central Florida, as "a champion of the counter-jihad left".

Harris is critical of the Christian right in politics in the United States, blaming them for the political focus on "pseudo-problems like gay marriage". He is also critical of liberal Christianityas represented, for instance, by the theology of Paul Tillichwhich he argues claims to base its beliefs on the Bible despite actually being influenced by secular modernity. He further states that in so doing liberal Christianity provides rhetorical cover to fundamentalists.

Spirituality

Harris holds that there is "nothing irrational about seeking the states of mind that lie at the core of many religions. Compassion, awe, devotion, and feelings of oneness are surely among the most valuable experiences a person can have."

Harris rejects the dichotomy between spirituality and rationality, favoring a middle path that preserves spirituality and science but does not involve religion. He writes that spirituality should be understood in light of scientific disciplines like neuroscience and psychology. Science, he contends, can show how to maximize human well-being, but may fail to answer certain questions about the nature of being, answers to some of which he says are discoverable directly through our experience. His conception of spirituality does not involve a belief in any god.

In Waking Up: A Guide to Spirituality Without Religion (2014), Harris describes his experience with Dzogchen, a Tibetan Buddhist meditation practice, and recommends it to his readers. He writes that the purpose of spirituality (as he defines it – he concedes that the term's uses are diverse and sometimes indefensible) is to become aware that our sense of self is illusory, and says this realization brings both happiness and insight into the nature of consciousness, mirroring core Buddhist beliefs. This process of realization, he argues, is based on experience and is not contingent on faith. Harris especially recommends the "headless" meditation technique as written about by Douglas Harding.

Science and morality
In The Moral Landscape, Harris argues that science can answer moral problems and aid human well-being.

Free will

Harris says that the idea of free will "cannot be mapped on to any conceivable reality" and is incoherent. Harris writes in Free Will that neuroscience "reveals you to be a biochemical puppet."

Artificial intelligence
Harris has discussed existential risk from artificial general intelligence in depth. He has given a TED talk on the topic, arguing it will be a major threat in the future and criticizing the paucity of human interest on the subject. He argues the dangers from artificial intelligence (AI) follow from three premises: that intelligence is the result of physical information processing, that humans will continue innovation in AI, and that humans are nowhere near the maximum possible extent of intelligence. Harris states that even if superintelligent AI is five to ten decades away, the scale of its implications for human civilization warrants discussion of the issue in the present.

Political views 
Harris describes himself as a liberal, is a registered Democrat and has never voted Republican in presidential elections. He supports same-sex marriage and decriminalizing drugs. In an op-ed for the Los Angeles Times, Harris said that he supported most of the criticism against Bush administration's war in Iraq, and all criticism of fiscal policy and the administration's treatment of science. Harris also said that liberalism has grown "dangerously out of touch with the realities of our world" when it comes to threats allegedly posed by Islamic fundamentalism. 

During the COVID-19 pandemic, he criticized commentators for pushing views on Covid he considered to be "patently insane". Harris accused these commentators of believing that Covid polices were a way of implementing social control and to crackdown on peoples freedom politically. In 2023, he said that if Covid had killed more children there  would be no patience for vaccine skepticism.

Presidential elections 
During the 2016 United States presidential election, Harris supported Hillary Clinton in the Democratic Party presidential primaries against Bernie Sanders, and despite calling her "a terribly flawed candidate for the presidency," he favored her in the general election and came out strongly in opposition to Donald Trump's candidacy. Harris has criticized Trump for lying, stating in 2018 that Trump "has assaulted truth more than anyone in human history."

In the 2020 United States presidential election, Harris supported Andrew Yang in the Democratic primaries. Harris also introduced Yang to podcaster Joe Rogan. After the 2020 election, he said that he did not care what was on the Hunter Biden's laptop saying "Hunter Biden literally could have had the corpses of children in his basement - I would not have cared”. He went on to say that nothing on the laptop would come close to even the Trump university scandal. He also said that twitter censoring the laptop was a "conspiracy" but that it was warranted. He has however walked back his comments about the laptop.

Economics 
Harris supports raising taxes on the wealthy, reducing government spending, and has criticized billionaires like Bill Gates and Warren Buffett for paying little taxes. He has proposed taxing 10% for estates worth above 10 million, taxing 50% for estates worth over a billion dollars, and then using the money to fund an infrastructure bank.

He has accused conservatives of perceiving raising taxes is a form theft or punishment and that they believe that by being rich creates a value for others.  He has regarded this view as ludicrous saying "markets aren’t perfectly reflective of the value of goods and services, and many wealthy people don’t create much in the way of value for others. In fact, as our recent financial crisis has shown, it is possible for a few people to become extraordinarily rich by wrecking the global economy".

Gun rights 
Harris owns guns, and wrote in 2015 that he understood people's hostility towards gun culture in the United States and the political influence of the National Rifle Association. However he argued that there is a rational case for gun ownership due to the fact that the police can not always be relied on and that guns are a good alternative.

Harris has stated that he disagrees with proposals by liberals and gun control advocates proposals for restricting guns such as the Assault weapons ban since more  gun crimes are committed with handguns than semi automatic weapons which the ban would get rid of. Harris has also said that the left wing media gets many things wrong about guns.

Intellectual dark web 
Harris was once a member of the intellectual dark web, a group that opposes political correctness and identity politics. New York Times journalist Bari Weiss described the group as "a collection of iconoclastic thinkers, academic renegades and media personalities who are having a rolling conversation – on podcasts, YouTube and Twitter, and in sold-out auditoriums – that sound unlike anything else happening, at least publicly, in the culture right now." In November 2020, Harris stated that he does not identify as a part of that group. Other members of the group include Joe Rogan, Bret Weinstein, and Jordan Peterson. In 2021 Harris said on his podcast that he had left the intellectual dark web and "turn[ed] in [his] imaginary membership card to this imaginary organization".

Controversies

Race and IQ controversy 
In April 2017, Harris hosted the social scientist Charles Murray on his podcast, discussing topics including the heritability of IQ and race and intelligence. Harris stated the invitation was out of indignation at a violent protest against Murray at Middlebury College the month before and not out of particular interest in the material at hand. The podcast episode garnered significant criticism, most notably from Vox and Slate. In the Vox article, scientists, including Eric Turkheimer, Kathryn Paige Harden, and Richard E. Nisbett, accused Harris of participating in “pseudoscientific racialist speculation” and peddling “junk science”. Harris and Murray were defended by conservative commentators Andrew Sullivan and Kyle Smith. Harris and Vox editor-at-large Ezra Klein later discussed the affair in a podcast interview in which Klein accused Harris of "thinking tribally" and Harris accused the Vox article of leading people to think he was racist.

Accusations of Islamophobia 
Harris has been accused of Islamophobia by journalist Glenn Greenwald and linguist and political commentator Noam Chomsky. Greenwald characterized some of Harris's statements as Islamophobic, such as: "the people who speak most sensibly about the threat that Islam poses to Europe are actually fascists," and "[t]he only future devout Muslims can envisage – as Muslims – is one in which all infidels have been converted to Islam, politically subjugated, or killed." After Harris and Chomsky exchanged a series of emails on terrorism and U.S. foreign policy in 2015, Chomsky said Harris had not prepared adequately for the exchange and that this revealed his work as unserious. Kyle Schmidlin also wrote in Salon that he considered Chomsky the winner of the exchange because Harris's arguments relied excessively on thought experiments with little application to the real world. In a 2016 interview with Al Jazeera English UpFront, Chomsky further criticized Harris, saying he "specializes in hysterical, slanderous charges against people he doesn't like."

Harris has countered that his views on this and other topics are frequently misrepresented by "unethical critics" who "deliberately" regard his words out of context. He has also criticized the validity of the term "Islamophobia." "My criticism of Islam is a criticism of beliefs and their consequences, but my fellow liberals reflexively view it as an expression of intolerance toward people," he wrote following a disagreement with actor Ben Affleck in October 2014 on the show Real Time with Bill Maher. Affleck had described Harris's and host Bill Maher's views on Muslims as "gross" and "racist," and Harris's statement that "Islam is the mother lode of bad ideas" as an "ugly thing to say." Affleck also compared Harris's and Maher's rhetoric to that of people who use antisemitic canards or define African-Americans in terms of intraracial crime. Several conservative American media pundits in turn criticized Affleck and praised Harris and Maher for broaching the topic, saying that discussing it had become taboo.

Harris's dialogue on Islam with Maajid Nawaz received a combination of positive reviews and mixed reviews. Irshad Manji wrote: "Their back-and-forth clarifies multiple confusions that plague the public conversation about Islam." Of Harris specifically, she said "[he] is right that liberals must end their silence about the religious motives behind much Islamist terror. At the same time, he ought to call out another double standard that feeds the liberal reflex to excuse Islamists: Atheists do not make nearly enough noise about hatred toward Muslims."

Hamid Dabashi, a professor at Columbia University accused Sam Harris of being a "new atheist crusader" having never studied Islam thoroughly and having no special insight into any Muslim community on earth. He further accused Harris of engaging in such language to justify Western imperialism in the Muslim world. An article published in The Guardian accused Harris, along with Milo Yiannopoulos of influencing young white men into becoming racists and anti-Muslim bigots. Hatewatch staff at the Southern Poverty Law Center (SPLC) wrote that members of the "skeptics" movement, of which Harris is "one of the most public faces," help to "channel people into the alt-right." Bari Weiss wrote the SPLC had misrepresented Harris's views.

Chris Hedges accused Harris of "advancing neoconservative agendas", of advocating a nuclear first strike policy on Muslims, if an Islamist regime ever obtained nuclear weapons, and quoting from The End of Faith: Religion, Terror, and the Future of Reason by Harris that "in such a situation, the only thing likely to ensure our survival may be a nuclear first strike of our own."

Reception and recognition 
Harris's first two books, in which he lays out his criticisms of religion, received negative reviews from Christian scholars. From secular sources, the books received a mixture of negative reviews and positive reviews. In his review of The End of Faith, American historian Alexander Saxton criticized what he called Harris's "vitriolic and selective polemic against Islam," (emphasis in original) which he said "obscure[s] the obvious reality that the invasion of Iraq and the War against Terror are driven by religious irrationalities, cultivated and conceded to, at high policy levels in the U.S., and which are at least comparable to the irrationality of Islamic crusaders and Jihadists." By contrast, Stephanie Merritt wrote of the same book that Harris's "central argument in The End of Faith is sound: religion is the only area of human knowledge in which it is still acceptable to hold beliefs dating from antiquity and a modern society should subject those beliefs to the same principles that govern scientific, medical or geographical inquiry – particularly if they are inherently hostile to those with different ideas." Harris's first book, The End of Faith (2004), won the PEN/Martha Albrand Award for First Nonfiction.

Harris's next two books, which discuss philosophical issues relating to ethics and free will, received several negative academic reviews. In his review of The Moral Landscape, neuroscientist Kenan Malik criticized Harris for not engaging adequately with philosophical literature: "Imagine a sociologist who wrote about evolutionary theory without discussing the work of Darwin, Fisher, Mayr, Hamilton, Trivers or Dawkins on the grounds that he did not come to his conclusions by reading about biology and because discussing concepts such as 'adaptation', 'speciation', 'homology', 'phylogenetics' or 'kin selection' would 'increase the amount of boredom in the universe'. How seriously would we, and should we, take his argument?" Philosopher Daniel Dennett argued that Harris's book Free Will successfully refuted the common understanding of free will, but that he failed to respond adequately to the compatibilist understanding of free will. Dennett said the book was valuable because it expressed the views of many eminent scientists, but that it nonetheless contained a "veritable museum of mistakes" and that "Harris and others need to do their homework if they want to engage with the best thought on the topic." On the other hand, The Moral Landscape received a largely positive review from psychologists James Diller and Andrew Nuzzolilli. Additionally, Free Will received a mixed academic review from philosopher Paul Pardi, who acknowledged that while it suffers from some conceptual confusions and that the core argument is a bit too 'breezy', it serves as a "good primer on key ideas in physicalist theories of freedom and the will".

Harris's book on spirituality and meditation received mainly positive reviews as well as some mixed reviews. It was praised by Frank Bruni, for example, who described it as "so entirely of this moment, so keenly in touch with the growing number of Americans who are willing to say that they do not find the succor they crave, or a truth that makes sense to them, in organized religion."

In 2018, Robert Wright, a visiting professor of science and religion at Union Theological Seminary, published an article in Wired criticizing Harris, whom he described as "annoying" and "deluded". Wright wrote that Harris, despite claiming to be a champion of rationality, ignored his own cognitive biases and engaged in faulty and inconsistent arguments in his book The End of Faith. He wrote that "the famous proponent of New Atheism is on a crusade against tribalism but seems oblivious to his own version of it." Wright wrote that these biases are rooted in natural selection and impact everyone, but that they can be mitigated when acknowledged.

The UK Business Insider included Harris's podcast in their list of "8 podcasts that will change how you think about human behavior" in 2017, and PC Magazine included it in their list of "The Best Podcasts of 2018." In January 2020, Max Sanderson included Harris's podcast as a "Producer pick" in a "podcasts of the week" section for The Guardian. The Waking Up podcast won the 2017 Webby Award for "People's Voice" in the category "Science & Education" under "Podcasts & Digital Audio".

Harris was included on a list of the "100 Most Spiritually Influential Living People 2019" in the Watkins Review, a publication of Watkins Books, a London esoterica bookshop.

Personal life
Harris is a martial arts student and practices Brazilian jiu-jitsu.

In 2004, he married Annaka Gorton, an author and editor of nonfiction and scientific books after engaging in a common interest about the nature of consciousness. They have two daughters and live in Los Angeles.

In September 2020, Harris became a member of Giving What We Can, an effective altruism organization whose members pledge to give at least 10% of their income to effective charities, both as an individual and as a company with Waking Up.

Works

Books

Documentary

 Amila, D. & Shapiro, J. (2018). Islam and the Future of Tolerance. United States: The Orchard.

Peer-reviewed articles

Notes

References

External links

 
 
 
 

1967 births
21st-century American essayists
21st-century American male writers
21st-century American non-fiction writers
21st-century American philosophers
21st-century atheists
21st-century educators
21st-century social scientists
Action theorists
Activists from California
American atheism activists
American critics of Islam
American ethicists
American logicians
American male essayists
American male non-fiction writers
American people of Jewish descent
American podcasters
American practitioners of Brazilian jiu-jitsu
American psychedelic drug advocates
American science writers
American secularists
American skeptics
American social commentators
American social sciences writers
American spiritual writers
Analytic philosophers
Artificial intelligence ethicists
Artificial intelligence researchers
Atheist philosophers
California Democrats
American cognitive neuroscientists
American consciousness researchers and theorists
Criticism of religion
Critics of alternative medicine
Critics of conspiracy theories
Critics of creationism
Critics of multiculturalism
Critics of neoconservatism
Critics of postmodernism
Critics of religions
Epistemologists
Free speech activists
Freethought writers
Hyperreality theorists
Literacy and society theorists
Living people
Metaphysics writers
Moral realists
New Atheism
Ontologists
People associated with effective altruism
Philosophers of culture
Philosophers of education
Philosophers of history
Philosophers of identity
Philosophers of logic
Philosophers of love
Philosophers of mind
Philosophers of psychology
Philosophers of religion
Philosophers of science
Philosophers of sexuality
Philosophers of technology
Philosophers of war
Political philosophers
Race and intelligence controversy
Rationalists
Science activists
Social philosophers
Stanford University alumni
Students of U Pandita
Theorists on Western civilization
University of California, Los Angeles alumni
Writers about activism and social change
Writers about globalization
Writers about religion and science
Writers from Los Angeles